Boss General Catalogue (GC, sometimes General Catalogue) is an astronomical catalogue containing 33,342 stars. It was compiled by Benjamin Boss and published in the United States in 1936. Its original name was General Catalogue of 33,342 Stars and it superseded the previous Preliminary General Catalogue of 6,188 Stars for the Epoch 1900 published in 1910 by Benjamin's father Lewis Boss.

External links 
 Online version of the Catalog

Astronomical catalogues of stars
1910 non-fiction books
1936 non-fiction books
1930s in science
1910s in science
1936 in science
1910 in science
1900 in science